Hooker Corner is an extinct town that was located in Pine Township in Warren County, Indiana, west of the town of Pine Village.

A few buildings in the community exist, and it is still cited by the USGS.

Geography
Hooker Corner is located at  near the intersection of Rainsville Road and State Road 26, approximately three-and-a-half miles west of Pine Village.

References

Former populated places in Warren County, Indiana
Ghost towns in Indiana